John Luntley was Archdeacon of Cardigan from 1534 to 1542.

Luntley was educated at the University of Oxford.

References

Alumni of the University of Oxford
16th-century Welsh Anglican priests
Archdeacons of Cardigan